Tāmihana (born Katu) Te Rauparaha (1820s – October 1876) was a notable New Zealand Māori leader, Christian evangelist, assessor, writer and farmer.  He was born in Pukearuhe, Taranaki, New Zealand, the son of the great Ngāti Toa leader Te Rauparaha and his fifth and senior wife, Te Ākau of Tūhourangi.

Tāmihana was strongly influenced by Church Missionary Society teaching. In 1842 Tāmihana worked as a missionary in the South Island, easing fears of renewed conflict from his father's old enemies. The following year he married Ruta Te Kapu in Otaki. In October 1850 he sailed for England, where he was presented to Queen Victoria. On his return Tāmihana became supportive of the idea of a Māori King to unify tribes. Initially he joined the King movement in opposing  the selling of Māori  land to the government, but when a chief of Te Āti Awa, Wiremu Kīngi got into conflict with the government over the sale of land at Waitara, he broke with the movement and sided with the government over issues of land and sovereignty.

He died on 24 October 1876 and is said to be buried in an unmarked grave at Ōtaki, beside his wife. They had had no children, but had an adopted son.

Writer

Between 1866 and 1869 Tāmihana wrote a 50,000 word account in te reo Māori about his father, the great Te Rauparaha called He pukapuka tātaku i ngā mahi a Te Rauparaha nui / A record of the life of the great Te Rauparaha which was translated into English by Ross Calman and published by Auckland University Press.

References

1820s births
1876 deaths
Ngāti Toa people
Signatories of the Treaty of Waitangi
New Zealand Māori religious leaders
New Zealand writers
People from Taranaki